Purna Chandra Malik ( 5 October 1946, Rayan in Burdwan district (West Bengal)) is a leader of Communist Party of India (Marxist) from West Bengal. He served as member of the Lok Sabha representing Durgapur (Lok Sabha constituency). He was elected to 8th, 9th and 10th Lok Sabha.

References

India MPs 1991–1996
People from Purba Bardhaman district
1946 births
Living people
India MPs 1989–1991
India MPs 1984–1989
Lok Sabha members from West Bengal